Cub Creek is a stream in the U.S. state of Tennessee. It is a tributary to the Tennessee River.

Cub Creek was named for the fact bears were hunted there by pioneers.

References

Rivers of Decatur County, Tennessee
Rivers of Henderson County, Tennessee
Rivers of Tennessee